The 2014–15 Elon Phoenix women's basketball team represents Elon University during the 2014–15 NCAA Division I women's basketball season. The Phoenix, led by fourth year head coach Charlotte Smith, play their home games at Alumni Gym and were first year members of the Colonial Athletic Association. They finished the season 19–13, 11–7 in CAA play finish in a tie for third place. They advanced to the semifinals of the CAA women's tournament where they lost to James Madison. They were invited to the Women's National Invitational Tournament where they lost to Georgia Tech in the first round.

Roster

Schedule

|-
!colspan=9 style="background:#910028; color:#CDB87D;"| Exhibition

|-
!colspan=9 style="background:#910028; color:#CDB87D;"| Non-conference regular season

|-
!colspan=9 style="background:#910028; color:#CDB87D;"| CAA regular season

|-
!colspan=9 style="background:#910028; color:#CDB87D;"| CAA Women's Tournament

|-
!colspan=9 style="background:#910028; color:#CDB87D;"| WNIT

See also 
2014–15 Elon Phoenix men's basketball team

References 

Elon Phoenix women's basketball seasons
Elon